The Florida Southern Moccasins (also shortened to Florida Southern Mocs) are the athletic teams that represent Florida Southern College, located in Lakeland, Florida, in NCAA Division II intercollegiate sports. The Moccasins compete as members of the Sunshine State Conference in 17 varsity sports. Florida Southern has been a member of the conference since its founding in 1975. Florida Southern also competes as independents six other sports.

Championships
Florida Southern's athletic program is one of the most prolific in Division II sports with 30 national championships, including in men's golf (13), baseball (9), women's golf (4), men's basketball (2), softball (1), and women's lacrosse (1). Moccasin athletes have also captured 22 individual NCAA National Championships, including 8 in men's golf, 6 in women's golf, 5 in women's swimming, and 3 in men's swimming. Florida Southern's most recent championship came in 2016 when the women's lacrosse team won its first NCAA title. The college competes in 20 sports, 9 for men, 10 for women, and 1 co-ed sport.

Varsity teams

Men's basketball
The men's basketball program has experienced significant success since the inception of the SSC in 1975. The Mocs have won the SSC regular season 22 times and have also been crowned SSC Tournament Champions 22 times. FSC, which won consecutive regular and postseason titles from 2012–2014, leads the SSC in conference wins (310), and owns the best winning percentage of any current member (.711). 

The men's basketball team made three straight trips to the Final Four from 1980 to 1982, finishing third in 1980, winning the 1981 national title with a 73–68 win over Mount St. Mary's, and finishing as national runner-up in 1982, falling to University of the District of Columbia, 73–63. The Mocs took the national title again in 2015 with a 77–62 win over Indiana University of Pennsylvania, and Kevin Capers was named tournament MVP and first team all-American.

Baseball

The Mocs baseball program has won 17 SSC baseball championships and nine national championships (1971, 1972, 1975, 1978, 1981, 1985, 1988, 1995, and 2005). The team has also finished as national runner up four times (1979, 1982, 1984, 1994). The Moccasins finished the 2014 season 35–19, and as runner-up at the NCAA South Regional Tournament. In addition to NCAA play, the baseball team traditionally plays an exhibition game against the Detroit Tigers, who conduct their Spring Training in Lakeland. The head coach since 2013 is former Florida Southern and MLB player Lance Niekro, son of MLB pitcher Joe Niekro and nephew of MLB pitcher Phil Niekro. The Moccasins have had 13 MLB draft picks and many free agent MLB signees under Coach Niekro.

Golf

Men
The men's golf program has won 13 NCAA National Championships (1981, 1982, 1985, 1986, 1990, 1991, 1995, 1996, 1998, 1999, 2000, 2010, 2017), finished as national runner ups 3 times (1979, 1984, 1988), and produced nine individual national champions: 1979 (Tom Gleeton), 1981 (Tom Patri), 1986 (Lee Janzen), 1999 (Matt Saglio), 2000 (Jeff Klauk), 2013 (Tim Crouch), 2014 (Tim Crouch), 2018 (John VanDerLaan), and 2019 (Michael VanDerLaan). Among the more successful Moccasin alumni are PGA Tour members Rocco Mediate, Lee Janzen and Jeff Klauk.

Women
The women's golf team has won four national championships (2000, 2001, 2002, 2007). From 1998 to 2004, the team played in the finals each year, winning three consecutive championships (2000, 2001, 2002). In the seven seasons between 1996 and 2002, the program produced three two-time individual national champions (five consecutive): Shanna Nagy 1996 & 1998, Lisa Cave 1999 & 2000, and Jana Peterkova 2001 & 2002.

Men's swimming
The men's swimming program has also experienced success at the national level placing third in 2012 and 2016 and runner-up in 2013 and 2014.

Esports
In November 2017, Florida Southern announced their journey into collegiate Esports — the first varsity program of its kind in Florida. Senior, Nathan Carson was selected to serve as the head coach for the Mocs in their inaugural year. In January 2018, the Moccasins announced rosters for Hearthstone and League of Legends. In August 2018, the Mocs Esports team introduced two additional teams competing in Overwatch and Rocket League.

Football
The Florida Southern Moccasins football team represented the college in the sport of American football from 1912 to 1935, with a break during the 1918 season. The team's overall record was 57–70–8. From 1926 to 1930 it was a member of the Southern Intercollegiate Athletic Association. In 1913, Florida Southern lost to Florida 144–0. In 1919, Southern upset the Gators 7–0.

Notable alumni

Baseball
Brian Butterfield, baseball coach
Ralph Citarella, baseball player
Rob Dibble, baseball player
Eddie Gaillard, baseball player
John Hudek, baseball player
James Hurst, baseball player
Matt Joyce, baseball player
Andy McGaffigan, baseball player
Lance Niekro, baseball player
Greg Pryor, baseball player
Carlos Reyes, baseball player
Gus Schlosser, baseball player
Brett Tomko, baseball player

Men's basketball
Goof Bowyer, basketball coach
Jessie Burbage, basketball coach
Linc Darner, basketball coach
Jimmy R. Haygood, basketball coach
Hal Wissel, basketball coach
Kevin Capers, basketball player

Women's Basketball
 Emma Cannon, basketball player

Men's golf
Lee Janzen, professional golfer
Rocco Mediate, professional golfer

Men's soccer
Clay Roberts, former soccer player, current coach

References

External links
 

 
Sports in Polk County, Florida